Paul-Henri Mathieu was the defending champion but lost in the first round to Rainer Schüttler.

Schüttler won in the final 7–5, 6–3 against Arnaud Clément.

Seeds

  Rainer Schüttler (champion)
  Sébastien Grosjean (first round)
  Paradorn Srichaphan (semifinals)
  Félix Mantilla (first round)
  Mardy Fish (first round)
  Wayne Ferreira (first round)
  Marat Safin (first round)
  Yevgeny Kafelnikov (first round)

Draw

Finals

Top half

Bottom half

References
 2003 Grand Prix de Tennis de Lyon Main Draw
 2003 Grand Prix de Tennis de Lyon Qualifying Draw

Singles
Singles